On Friday, 1 November 1974, an Antonov An-2 single-engine biplane and a Mil Mi-8 helicopter collided near Surgut airport, killing all 38 people (14 on the airplane and 24 on the helicopter) on board the two aircraft.

Aircraft involved
The An-2 serial number 1G132-21 was registered USSR-70766 and was certified for operation on 4 November 1971. The airframe had a total operating time of 2,591 flight hours with 3,477 landings.

The Mi-8T serial number 3771 was registered USSR-25686 and was certified on 8 June 1973. The total operating time of the helicopter was 1,298 hours with 3,416 landings.

Accident
The An-2 was operating as Flight 662, a passenger service from Khanty-Mansiysk to Surgut and departed at 11:36 Moscow time with 2 crew members and 12 passengers. At 12:54, the Mi-8 took off from Surgut airport, despite the fact that the weather conditions were below its meteorological minimum. The An-2 was approaching Surgut airport on a heading of 253 degrees in instrument meteorological conditions, then turned to a heading of 73 degrees to land.

Investigation
The main cause of the accident was the unsatisfactory management of the air traffic zone of Surgut airport. In the conditions of poor visibility, approach procedures were violated and dispatchers released and received aircraft despite the fact that meteorological minimums for these types were not met. A contributing factor was the lack of control over the movement of aircraft by radar and poor radio communication.

See also
Aeroflot accidents and incidents
Aeroflot accidents and incidents in the 1970s

References

Aviation accidents and incidents in the Soviet Union
Aviation accidents and incidents in 1974
Accidents and incidents involving the Mil Mi-8
1974 in the Soviet Union
Aeroflot
1974 in Russia